The Municipality of Louise is a rural municipality (RM) in the Canadian province of Manitoba.

History

It was created on January 1, 2015 via the amalgamation of the RM of Louise, the Town of Pilot Mound and the Village of Crystal City. It was formed as a requirement of The Municipal Amalgamations Act, which required that municipalities with a population less than 1,000 amalgamate with one or more neighbouring municipalities by 2015. The Government of Manitoba initiated these amalgamations in order for municipalities to meet the 1997 minimum population requirement of 1,000 to incorporate a municipality.

Communities
Clearwater
Crystal City
Pilot Mound

Demographics 

See also
 Hannah–Snowflake Border Crossing
 Sarles–Crystal City Border Crossing

References 

2015 establishments in Manitoba
Manitoba municipal amalgamations, 2015
Populated places established in 2015
Rural municipalities in Manitoba